The 1948 Georgia Bulldogs football team represented the University of Georgia as a member of the Southeastern Conference (SEC) during the 1948 college football season. Led by tenth-year head coach Wally Butts, the Bulldogs compiled an overall record of 9–2 with a mark of 6–0 in conference play, winning the SEC title. Georgia was invited to the Orange Bowl, where the Bulldogs lost to Texas. The team played home games at Sanford Stadium in Athens, Georgia.

Schedule

References

Georgia
Georgia Bulldogs football seasons
Southeastern Conference football champion seasons
Georgia Bulldogs football